Callan Potter (born 6 September 1984) is an Australian retired mixed martial artist who most recently competed in the Welterweight division of the Ultimate Fighting Championship (UFC).

Mixed martial arts career

Early career
Potter compiled a professional mixed martial arts record of 17–7 by fighting within the Australian regional MMA circuit for over 7 years winning various regional MMA titles before signing for UFC in January 2019.

Ultimate Fighting Championship
Potter made his UFC debut at lightweight on 9 February 2019 against Jalin Turner at UFC 234. He lost the fight via TKO in round one.

Potter then returned to welterweight and faced Maki Pitolo on 5 October 2019 at UFC 243. He won the fight via unanimous decision.

Potter then faced Song Kenan on 23 February 2020 at UFC Fight Night: Felder vs. Hooker. He lost the fight via KO in the first round. He was subsequently released from the promotion.

On August 7, 2020, Potter announced his retirement from mixed martial arts

Personal life
Just before announcing his retirement, Potter started coaching at Dan Kelly's team Resilience Training Centre.

Championships and accomplishments

Eternal MMA
 EMMA Lightweight Championship (One time) 
 One successful title defence 
Hex Fight Series
 HEX Lightweight Championship (One time) 
 One successful title defence 
Valor Fight
 Valor Fight Welterweight Championship (One time) 
 One successful title defence

Mixed martial arts record

|-
|Loss
|align=center|18–9
|Song Kenan
|KO (punches)
|UFC Fight Night: Felder vs. Hooker
|
|align=center|1
|align=center|2:20
|Auckland, New Zealand, New Zealand
|
|-
|Win
|align=center|18–8
|Maki Pitolo
|Decision (unanimous)
|UFC 243
|
|align=center|3
|align=center|5:00
|Melbourne, Australia
|
|-
|Loss
|align=center|17–8
|Jalin Turner
|TKO (body kick and punches)
|UFC 234
|
|align=center|1
|align=center|0:53
|Melbourne, Australia
|
|-
|Win
|align=center|17–7
|B.J. Bland
|Decision (split)
|EMMA – Eternal MMA 40
|
|align=center|3
|align=center|5:00
|Perth, Western Australia, Australia
|
|-
|Loss
|align=center|16–7
|Marcin Held
|Technical Submission (heel hook)
|ACB 88 – Barnatt vs. Celinski
|
|align=center|1
|align=center|1:09
|Brisbane, Queensland, Australia
|
|-
|Win
|align=center|16–6
|Jack Becker
|KO (punch)
|HFS – Hex Fight Series 12
|
|align=center|3
|align=center|0:32
|Melbourne, Australia
|
|-
|Win
|align=center|15–6
|Brentin Mumford
|Submission (rear-naked choke)
|EMMA – Eternal MMA 29
|
|align=center|1
|align=center|3:43
|Gold Coast, Queensland, Australia
|
|-
|Win
|align=center|14–6
|Abel Brites
|Submission (triangle choke)
|HFS – Hex Fight Series 8
|
|align=center|1
|align=center|1:48
|Melbourne, Australia
|
|-
|Win
|align=center|13–6
|Isaac Tisdell
|Submission (guillotine choke)
|EMMA – Eternal MMA 20
|
|align=center|1
|align=center|1:04
|Gold Coast, Queensland, Australia
|
|-
|Win
|align=center|12–6
|Matiu Thoms
|Submission (rear-naked choke)
|HFS 6 – Ebersole vs. Kennedy
|
|align=center|1
|align=center|3:21
|Melbourne, Australia
|
|-
|Win
|align=center|11–6
|Sam Hayward
|KO (head kick)
|HFS – Hex Fight Series 5
|
|align=center|3
|align=center|0:17
|Melbourne, Australia
|
|-
|Win
|align=center|10–6
|Steven Maxwell
|Submission (rear-naked choke)
|Minotaur 2 – Rampage
|
|align=center|1
|align=center|
|Parkville, Victoria, Australia
|
|-
|Win
|align=center|9–6
|Kahn Sandy
|Submission (arm-triangle choke)
|HFS – Hex Fight Series 4
|
|align=center|2
|align=center|4:10
|Melbourne, Australia
|
|-
|Loss
|align=center|8–6
|David Vergers
|TKO (punches)
|K-Oz Entertainment – Bragging Rights 7: Resurrection
|
|align=center|1
|align=center|3:09
|Perth, Western Australia, Australia
|
|-
|Loss
|align=center|8–5
|Steve Kennedy
|Submission (rear-naked choke)
|HFS – Hex Fight Series 2
|
|align=center|1
|align=center|3:15
|Melbourne, Australia
|
|-
|Win
|align=center|8–4
|Stuart Dare
|KO (head kick)
|Valor Fight 9 – Potter vs. Dare
|
|align=center|5
|align=center|1:14
|Launceston, Tasmania, Australia
|
|-
|Loss
|align=center|7–4
|Corey Nelson
|KO (punches)
|AFC 9 – Australian Fighting Championship 9
|
|align=center|1
|align=center|3:15
|Albury, New South Wales, Australia
|
|-
|Win
|align=center|7–3
|David Butt
|KO (head kick)
|Valor Fight 7 – Potter vs. Butt
|
|align=center|2
|align=center|0:11
|Launceston, Tasmania, Australia
|
|-
|Win
|align=center|6–3
|Troy Resic
|TKO (punches)
|AFC 7 – Australian Fighting Championship 7
|
|align=center|1
|align=center|3:40
|Melbourne, Australia
|
|-
|Win
|align=center|5–3
|David Deconte
|Submission (armbar)
|MMADU – MMA Down Under 4
|
|align=center|1
|align=center|1:54
|Findon, South Australia, Australia
|
|-
|Win
|align=center|4–3
|Nick Denholm
|Submission (guillotine choke)
|Valor Fight 5 – One Year Anniversary
|
|align=center|1
|align=center|0:41
|Launceston, Tasmania, Australia
|
|-
|Win
|align=center|3–3
|Damon Upton-Greer
|TKO (punches)
|Valor Fight 5 – One Year Anniversary
|
|align=center|1
|align=center|0:08
|Launceston, Tasmania, Australia
|
|-
|Loss
|align=center|2–3
|Jake Matthews
|Submission (triangle armbar)
|Shamrock Events – Night of Mayhem 6
|
|align=center|1
|align=center|1:42
|Keysborough, Victoria, Australia
|
|-
|Win
|align=center|2–2
|Alex Oliver
|Submission (rear-naked choke)
|Valor Fight 3 – Invicta
|
|align=center|1
|align=center|0:47
|Launceston, Tasmania, Australia
|
|-
|Loss
|align=center|1–2
|Richard Walsh
|KO (knee)
|Gladiators Cage Fighting – Gladiators 2
|
|align=center|1
|align=center|4:15
|Sydney, Australia
|
|-
|Win
|align=center|1–1
|Domenic Chiavone
|KO (punches)
|Shamrock Events – Kings of Kombat 7
|
|align=center|1
|align=center|
|Melbourne, Australia
|
|-
|Loss
|align=center|0–1
|Nick Patterson
|Submission (triangle choke)
|Brute Force 15 – In the Line of Fire
|
|align=center|2
|align=center|2:38
|Coburg, Victoria, Australia
|
|-

See also 
 List of current UFC fighters
 List of male mixed martial artists

References

External links 

 
 

1984 births
Living people
Australian male mixed martial artists
Welterweight mixed martial artists
Mixed martial artists utilizing Brazilian jiu-jitsu
Australian practitioners of Brazilian jiu-jitsu
People awarded a black belt in Brazilian jiu-jitsu
Sportspeople from Melbourne
Ultimate Fighting Championship male fighters